HDFC International Life and Re Company Limited (HDFC International Life & Re) is a first life reinsurance company based in the Dubai International Financial Centre (DIFC), UAE.

It is a wholly owned international subsidiary of HDFC Life and was incorporated on 10 January 2016 under the previous Companies Law DIFC Law No. 2 of 2009, registration number 2067. HDFC international Life & Re had received its regulatory license from the Dubai Financial Services Authority ("DFSA") effective on January 31, 2016, and is regulated by Dubai Financial Services Authority (DFSA). The company secured approval from SEZ authorities at GIFT City in Gujarat, India and an in-principal approval from International Financial Services Centres Authority (IFSCA) for setting up a global-in-house center.

Geographical reach 
The company with a registered paid up capital of US$29.5 million, is licensed and regulated by the DFSA to undertake life reinsurance business in the UAE and provide risk-transfer solutions, prudent underwriting solutions and value added services, among others, which includes individual life, group life and group credit life lines of business and currently offers reinsurance capacity in the Gulf Cooperation Council (“GCC”) region which includes life insurers/ cedents in the greater MENA ( Middle East and North Africa) region and India.

Services 
HDFC international Life & Re offers reinsurance on treaty and facultative basis As part of proportional reinsurance, it provides ‘quota share’ and/or ‘surplus’ for individual and group life policies as well as credit life policies. The reinsurance company also provides to its cedents customised insuretech platforms.

Key people 
Vibha Padalkar is the chairperson of HDFC International Life & Re.

The CEO of the company is Sameer Yogishwar.

Board of Directors include Vibha Padalkar,  Yuvraj Narayan, Davinder Rajpal and Suresh Badami.

Associated companies 
 HDFC Life 
 HDFC Health
 HDFC Bank
 HDFC Securities
 HDFC Mutual Fund
 HDFC Pension
 HDFC ERGO General Insurance
 HDB Financial Services 
 HDFC Realty
 HDFC Property Fund
 Credila
 HDFC Sales

References 

Financial services companies established in 2016
Reinsurance companies
HDFC Group